Events in the year 2021 in Djibouti.

Incumbents
President: Ismaïl Omar Guelleh
Prime Minister: Abdoulkader Kamil Mohamed

Events
Ongoing — COVID-19 pandemic in Djibouti

4 March – Twenty migrants drown after 80 people are thrown overboard on a boat en route from Djibouti to Yemen.

 9 April –  2021 Djiboutian presidential election.

References

 
2020s in Djibouti
Years of the 21st century in Djibouti
Djibouti
Djibouti